List of A roads in zone 1 in Great Britain beginning north of the River Thames, east of the A1 (roads beginning with 1).

Single- and double-digit roads

Triple-digit roads

Four-digit roads

1000s

1100s

1200s and higher

References

1
 1
 1